Pleasant Grove is an unincorporated community in Henry County, Virginia, in the U.S. state of Virginia. Located at the crossroads of Stones Dairy, Hodges Farm, Preston, and Wingfield Orchard Roads. It is about 7 miles west of Martinsville, between Horse Pasture and Bassett, Virginia.

References

Unincorporated communities in Virginia
Unincorporated communities in Pittsylvania County, Virginia